Nur Ernie Shahirah Zakri (born 23 June 1992) is a Malaysian singer, actress and vocal teacher. She rose to fame after winning national singing competition, Bintang RTM in 2009. In 2018, she alongside her duet partner Syamel Fodzly, were awarded Best Vocals at the 32nd Anugerah Juara Lagu (AJL 32). Besides singing, she used to teach music last two years at the Bentley Music Academy in Mutiara Damansara, Petaling Jaya.

Early life
Ernie was born in Kuala Lumpur, Malaysia, to mother Rafiaah Mohamed and Zakri Ahmad, a drummer. Through her mother, she is the niece to singers Ziana Zain and Anuar Zain. She attended SMK (P) Methodist, Kuala Lumpur before earning her degree in Music from Universiti Teknologi MARA Shah Alam. She also holds a Master's degree in Music from University of Malaya.

Vocal Profile

Voice Type: Light Lyric Soprano

Full Vocal Range : D3 - C6 - F6 - C#7

Supported Range : E3 - G5 - E6

Consistent Supported Range : F3 - F5 - C#6

Career
At 17, Ernie joined the search for Bintang RTM 2009 and eventually became the youngest winner of the national competition. She performed two songs at the finale, "Cahaya" and "Kau Yang Teristimewa". In 2011, she released her debut album Sinaran under FMC Music. She released two singles from the album, "Mahu Ingin Bercinta" and "Rindu Bukan Teman". Despite the effort, she failed to gained attention from local music lovers.

In 2017, Ernie alongside her duet partner Syamel Fodzly competed in a reality TV singing competition, Duo Star. The duo bested other contestants with their rendition of Dato' Sri Siti Nurhaliza's "Balqis" and Dato' Jamal Abdillah's "Kau Lupa Pada Janji". Upon winning the competition, Zakri and Syamel released their first duet single, "Aku Cinta". Their popularity, through Duo Star proved to be the breakthrough for Zakri after being in the industry since 2009. In 2018, "Aku Cinta" advanced into the finals of Anugerah Juara Lagu and the duo were awarded with Best Vocals. Later in 2018, she released her single, "Ku Bersuara".

Following the success of their partnership, the duo released their second duet single, "Takkan Terlerai" in April 2019. She also was chosen to be the voice of Bawang Merah and Bawang Putih in animated film, Upin & Ipin: Keris Siamang Tunggal. Zakri ventured into acting with her debut in television series, Suri Katriana which was aired on Astro Prima. In November 2019, her single "Ku Bersuara" was selected to be the finalists at the 34th Anugerah Juara Lagu. In 2020 her song entitled "Gundah" make the way once again to compete in the final for Anugerah Juara Lagu 35.On 14 March 2021, due to pandemic COVID-19, Anugerah Juara Lagu 35 was held without audiences. She managed to grab The Best Vocal award for AJL 35, making it as her second winning for Best Vocal award after the previous 32th edition. She was called Queen of Vocal Malaysia.

Personal life
Ernie marries fellow singer, Syamel in March 2021.

Discography

Studio albums
 Sinaran (2011)

Singles
As lead artist

As duet

Filmography

Film

Television series

Television shows

Awards and nominations

References

External links
Ernie Zakri on Youtube

Living people
1992 births
Malaysian women pop singers
Malaysian actresses
People from Kuala Lumpur
21st-century Malaysian women singers
Malaysian people of Malay descent
Malay-language singers
Bintang RTM participants